An ultramicroelectrode (UME) is a working electrode used in a voltammetry.  The small size of UME give them large diffusion layers and small overall currents.  These features allow UME to achieve useful steady-state conditions and very high scan rates (V/s) with limited distortion.  UME were developed independently by Wightman  and Fleischmann around 1980.
Small current at UME enables electrochemical measurements in low conductive media (organic solvents), where voltage drop associated with high solution resistance makes these experiments difficult for conventional electrodes. Furthermore, small voltage drop at UME leads to a very small voltage distortion at the electrode-solution interface which allows using two-electrode setup in voltammetric experiment instead of conventional three-electrode setup.

Design 
Ultramicroelectrodes are often defined as electrodes which are smaller than the diffusion layer achieved in a readily accessed experiment.  A working definition is an electrode that has at least one dimension (the critical dimension) smaller than 25 μm.  Platinum electrodes with a radius of 5 μm are commercially available and electrodes with critical dimension of 0.1 μm have been made.  Electrodes with even smaller critical dimension have been reported in the literature, but exist mostly as proofs of concept.  The most common UME is a disk shaped electrode created by embedding a thin wire in glass, resin, or plastic.  The resin is cut and polished to expose a cross section of the wire. Other shapes, such as wires and rectangles, have also been reported.
Carbon-fiber microelectrodes are fabricated with conductive carbon fibers sealed in glass capillary with exposed tips. These electrodes are frequently used with in vivo voltammetry.

Theory

Linear region 
Every electrode has a range of scan rates called the linear region. The response to a reversible redox couple in the linear region is a "diffusion controlled peak" which can be modeled with the Cottrell equation.  The upper limit of the useful linear region is bound by an excess of charging current combined with distortions created from large peak currents and associated resistance.  The charging current scales linearly with scan rate while the peak current, which contains the useful information, scales with the square root of scan rate.  As scan rates increase, the relative peak response diminishes.  Some of the charge current can be mitigated with RC compensation and/or mathematically removed after the experiment.  However, the distortions resulting from increased current and the associated resistance cannot be subtracted.  These distortions ultimately limit the scan rate for which an electrode is useful.  For example, a working electrode with a radius of 1.0 mm is not useful for experiments much greater than 500 mV/s.

Moving to an UME drops the currents being passed and thus greatly increases the useful sweep rate up to 106 V/s.  These faster scan rates allow the investigation of electrochemical reaction mechanisms with much higher rates than can be explored with regular working electrodes.  By adjusting the size of the working electrode an enormous kinetic range can be studied.  For UME only the very fast reactions can be studied through peak current since the linear region only exists for UME at very high scan rates.

Steady-state region 
At scan rates slower than those of the linear region is a region which is mathematically complex to model and rarely investigated.  At even slower scan rates there is the steady-state region.  In the steady-state region linear sweeps traces display reversible redox couple as steps rather than peaks.  These steps can readily be modeled for meaningful data.

To access the steady-state region the scan rate must be dropped.  As scan rates are slowed, the relative currents also drop at a given point reducing the reliability of the measurement.  The low ratio of diffusion layer volume to electrode surface area means regular stationary electrodes can not be dropped low enough before their current measurements become unreliable.  In contrast, the ratio of diffusion layer volume to electrode surface area is much higher for UME.  When the scan rate of UME is dropped it quickly enters the steady-state regime at useful scan rates.  Even though UME supply small total currents their steady-state currents are high compared to regular electrodes.

Rg Value 
The Rg value which is defined as R/r which is the ratio between the radius of insulation sheet (R) and the radius of the conductive material (r or a). The Rg value is a method to evaluate the quality of the UME, where a smaller Rg value means there is less interference to the diffusion towards the conductive material resulting in a better or more sensitive electrode. The Rg value obtain either by a rough estimation  from a microscope image (as long as the electrode was fabricated with an homogeneous wire with a known diameter) or by a direct calculation based on the steady state current (iss) obtained from a cyclic voltamogram based on the following equation:
iss=knFaDC*

Where k is a geometric constant (disk, k = 4; hemispherical, k =2π), n is the number of electrons involved in the reaction, F is the Faraday constant (96 485 C eq−1), a is the radius of the
electroactive surface, D is the diffusion coefficient of the redox species (Dferrocene methanol= 7.8 × 10−6  ; Druthenium hexamine = 8.7 × 10−6 cm2s−1) and C* is the concentration of dissolved redox species

See also
 Bioelectronics
 Multielectrode array
 Scanning electrochemical microscopy
 Fast-scan cyclic voltammetry

References

Electroanalytical chemistry devices
Electrodes